Our Lady of the Good Event (Spanish: Nuestra Señora del Buen Suceso) is a Catholic Marian title in Spanish-speaking countries. It is often mistranslated as "Our Lady of Good Success" due to the superficial similarity between the Spanish word "suceso" (meaning "event") and the English false friend "success". Properly speaking, the phrase "Good Event" refers to the Purification of Mary and the Presentation of Jesus.

16th-century church in Madrid

The Obregonians were a small Roman Catholic congregation of men, founded in Madrid by Bernardino de Obregón, and dedicated to the care of the sick. Their motherhouse was adjacent to the Church of Buen Suceso, which had originally been built around 1529 as the Hospital Real de la Corte (Royal Hospital of the Court). Since 1590 the structure was rebuilt as a new church and hospital. Around 1607, Pope Paul V presented the Obregonians with a statue of the Virgin, entitled Virgen del Buen Suceso. Copies of the image were produced and veneration of Mary under this title spread throughout Spain and its territories.

Apparition in Ecuador (1594-1634) 

A Conceptionist sister named Mariana Francisca de Jesús Torres [it] claimed to have received Marian apparitions under this title from 2 February 1594 to 2 February 1634 in Quito. In 1611, the local bishop, Salvador Ribera Avalos, gave his approval to the apparitions that had occurred up to that point.

Torres died on 16 January 1635, shortly after the last alleged apparition. When her tomb was reopened in 1906, her body was found to be incorrupt. The Archdiocese of Quito opened her cause for canonization in 1984 and finished the diocesan stage of the process in 1997.

Prophetic messages 

According to the Traditionalist Catholic organization Tradition in Action, which dissents from the Catholic Church's Second Vatican Council, a series of apparitions of under the title of Our Lady of the Good Success in the 1600s prophesied about the 19th and 20th century. A leader of this group, Marian T. Horvat, has published a series of pamphlets and books conveying these messages, purportedly based on manuscripts that were discovered in the 20th century that are once again lost.

The apparition messages purportedly predicted a "spiritual catastrophe" in the Catholic Church and in society, beginning "shortly after the middle of the twentieth century", including:

 Widespread moral corruption
 Profanation of the Sacrament of Matrimony
 Depraved priests who will scandalize the faithful and cause suffering for good priests
 Unbridled lust which will ensnare many souls
 Loss of innocence among children and loss of modesty among women
 Lack of priestly and religious vocations
 A period of catastrophe followed by a period of restoration.

On 8 December 1634 (according to these late-20th and 21st century claims), the apparition predicted that papal infallibility "will be declared a dogma of the Faith by the same Pope chosen to proclaim the dogma of the Mystery of My Immaculate Conception." In 1854, Pope Pius IX defined the dogma of the Immaculate Conception, and in 1870, he declared the dogma of papal infallibility as defined by the First Vatican Council.

Statue in the Philippines

A statue of Mary under the title of "Our Lady of the Good Event of Parañaque" is enshrined in St. Andrew's Cathedral in Parañaque, Philippines. Mary is also patroness of the city under this title.

Notes

References

Good Event